The R46 is a provincial route in Western Cape, South Africa that connects Malmesbury with Touws River, via Riebeek-Kasteel, Tulbagh and Ceres. The R46 is co-signed with the R44 between Gouda and Hermon in the Berg River valley.

References

External links
 Routes Travel Info

46 

Provincial routes in South Africa